Tsawwassen may refer to:

 Tsawwassen, British Columbia, a neighbourhood in the city of Delta, British Columbia
 Tsawwassen First Nation, a First Nations government near the Tsawwassen neighbourhood
 Tsawwassen Lands, the First Nations reserve of the Tsawwassen First Nation
 Tsawwassen ferry terminal, the main ferry terminal for transport between Metro Vancouver and Vancouver Island